This is the list of supermarket chains in Djibouti.

 Al Gamil
 Cash Centre Leader Price
 Casino Supermarkets
 Etablissement Ladieh 
 Napoleon Supermarkets
 Nougaprix
 Semiramis

Grocery shopping in Djibouti is old-fashioned. Convenience stores, markets, street-corner vendors and food trucks still constitute the main outlets of consumer goods.

See also
 List of supermarket chains in Africa
 List of supermarket chains

References

External links
 Stores, Malls or Markets In  Djibouti

Djibouti

Economy of Djibouti
Supermarket chains
Djibouti